Tetrarhanis nubifera, the white on-off, is a butterfly in the family Lycaenidae. The species was first described by Hamilton Herbert Druce in 1910. It is found in Cameroon, the Republic of the Congo and possibly south-eastern Nigeria. The habitat consists of primary forests.

References

Butterflies described in 1910
Poritiinae